is the fifth single by Japanese band An Cafe and is the initial track on the Shikisai Moment album. The song peaked at No. 67 on the Japanese singles chart.

Track listing
 "Tekesuta Kōsen" (テケスタ光線)

References

An Cafe songs
2005 singles
2005 songs
Loop Ash Records singles
Song articles with missing songwriters